Duke of Tarifa, is an hereditary title in the peerage of Spain, accompanied by the dignity of Grandee. It was granted to Ángela Maria Apolonia Pérez de Barradas y Bernuy on 28 June 1886 by king Alfonso XII. The tile was originally granted as "Duke of Denia and Tarifa" (duque de Denia y Tarifa) but was separated into two different titles on 22 December 1886 by the Queen Regent, Maria Christina of Austria.

Dukes of Denia y Tarifa (1886)
 Ángela María Apolonia Pérez de Barradas y Bernuy, 1st Duchess of Denia y Tarifa (1827-1903)

Dukes of Tarifa (1886)

 Ángela María Apolonia Pérez de Barradas y Bernuy, 1st Duchess of Tarifa (1827-1903)
 Carlos María de Constantinopla Fernández de Córdoba y Pérez de Barradas, 2nd Duke of Tarifa (1864-1931), son of the 1st Duchess
 Luis Fernández de Córdoba y Salabert, 3rd Duke of Tarifa (1880-1956), grandson of the 1st Duchess
 Victoria Eugenia Fernández de Córdoba y Fernández de Henestrosa, 4th Duchess of Tarifa (1917-2013), daughter of the 3rd Duke
 Victoria Elisabeth Hohenlohe-Langenburg y Schmidt-Polex, 5th Duchess of Tarifa (b. 1997), great-granddaughter of the 4th Duchess

See also
Duke of Denia
List of dukes in the peerage of Spain
List of current Grandees of Spain

References 

Dukedoms of Spain
Grandees of Spain
Lists of dukes
Lists of Spanish nobility